Adelbert S. Atherton (October 13, 1850 – December 14, 1920)  was an American politician from Chicopee, Massachusetts, who served in the Massachusetts House of Representatives after being elected to the 125th Massachusetts General Court in 1903. Prior to being a state legislator for the second district, he was initially a farmer, then an auctioneer; and finally a merchant, and owner of a general store.

Early life and education
He was the son of Samuel Hall Atherton and Abigail S. Taft. His father was a farmer.

Atherton was educated in public schools in Franklin County, Massachusetts and attended the Powers Institute.

Career
His civic roles prior to being a state representative were as a moderator at town meetings, and then as selectman. Atherton was elected as a Democratic candidate at a state level. As an elected member of the Massachusetts House of Representatives, he was appointed to the committee on agriculture.

Personal
Atherton married Milia H. Allen (1857–1936) on November 1, 1876, in Bernardston, Massachusetts. They had 5 children. He became a farmer, in the tradition of his forefathers. He was a trustee of the Powers Institute.

By 1919, he suffered economic troubles and filed for bankruptcy.

He died at the age of 70, in 1920 following a procedure at Farren hospital.

Ancestry
Atherton was a New England descendant of Puritan heritage, whose ancestors had settled in Massachusetts Bay Colony. He is a direct descendant of Major General Humphrey Atherton, via Hope Atherton and Sarah Hollister (1646–1691). His relatives include Samuel Atherton, Ray Atherton, Arlon S. Atherton, Percy Lee Atherton and Walter Atherton.

See also
 1904 Massachusetts legislature

References

1850 births
1920 deaths
People from Franklin, Massachusetts
Members of the Massachusetts House of Representatives
20th-century American politicians